This is a list of Pokémon Trading Card Game sets from the collectible card game that was first released in Japan in 1996. As of April 2022, there are 98 card sets released in the U.S. and 91 card sets in Japan, including special sets. As of September 2017, collectively, there are 6,959 cards in the Japanese sets and 9,110 cards in the English sets. The large difference stems from Non-Holo Foil duplicates of rare cards included in English sets that are not printed in Japanese sets. As of March 2017, 23.6 billion cards had been shipped worldwide.

The sets are generally considered into two lists: One for the first line of Wizards of the Coast cards and the second after Nintendo's acquisition of the card game after Wizards.  

The series first launched in English in late 1998, and Wizards of the Coast handled publishing.

First Generation Sets

1998 Pokémon Demo Game Plastic Pack 

The 1998 Pokémon Demo Game Pack was the earliest Pokémon card pack to be produced and released in the English Pokémon TCG and served as the first introduction to Pokémon cards in the United States. This Pokémon pack consists of 24 Base Set shadowless cards and an instruction manual.

Pokémon Base Set 

The Base Set, ( &  1st Starter & Expansion Pack) is the name given to the original core release of cards and Theme Decks for the Pokémon Trading Card Game. It was released in Japan on October 20, 1996 (one month after Bandai Pokémon Carddass 100 Pocket Monster Part 1 Green & Part 2 Red, September 1996), and in the United States on January 9, 1999. It is the only set and expansion so far not to have a set logo or symbol (except for the error "no symbol" Jungle set cards). It is one of few sets to include Fighting, Fire, Grass, Lightning, Psychic, and Water Energy cards, now commonly known as basic Energy cards. The set also contained Double Colorless Energy, the first special Energy card. The set is one of the most well-rounded sets available, with a mixed amount of Pokémons of all types, and includes only Pokémon from the original 150. Some of the more popular examples are Charizard, Blastoise, Venusaur, and Pikachu. The set's four main theme decks were based on four different strategies (offensive, defensive, tactic, and speed). This set also had a 2-player starter set, containing two half-sized decks with no intended strategy and a playmat.

The "1st issue" print and a few of the following ("2nd issue") prints have a slightly different design than the standard "unlimited" ("3rd issue") prints. These early prints are generally brighter in color, use a thinner font, have the year 1999 appear twice in the copyright notice, and lack the shadow around the pictures. Because of this, these cards are known as "shadowless" cards among collectors. Since not many prints were printed as "shadowless," these cards are rarer than the "unlimited" print. Cards printed right before the release of Base Set 2 has the year 2000 included in their copyright notices. These cards are known as "4th issue" cards and are also rarer than the "unlimited" print. Certain "4th issue" cards have slightly brighter color than the other prints.

Jungle 
Jungle was the second expansion set in the United States, adding new Pokémon and one Trainer to the bunch, and was released on June 16, 1999. After being a very small set in Japan, the English set started the trend of having alternate holographic and non-holographic editions of rare cards, effectively doubling the number of rares in the set. Some cards featured were Pikachu, Gloom, and Victreebel. Unlike Base Set, it had 2 preconstructed decks. The expansion symbol resembles a Vileplume. The set also contains a total of 64 cards.  During production, some of the jungle holos were printed without the jungle symbol. These holos sell for higher than the amount normal jungle holos sell for. All 16 holos from the set have the no symbol error. The rarest card in the first edition jungle set is a 1st edition promo "Ivy Pikachu", which was mistakenly printed with the set. It is rumored to be only one in 10 booster boxes.

The 48-card set included 45 new pokémon, two from the basic set with new powers (Electrode and Pikachu), and one trainer (Poké Ball).

Fossil 

Fossil, released on October 8, 1999, is the third expansion set of cards in the Pokémon Trading Card Game. The 62-card set that was sold in 11-card booster packs, and contained the fewest cards of any standard set in the card game. Future sets would often use a gimmick to differentiate their cards from other sets. This set was known for its unfinished holofoil printing error of Zapdos and the first TCG appearance of Ditto.

Base Set 2 

Base Set 2 is a compilation of selected cards from the previous Base Set and Jungle sets. Wizards of the Coast had a trend of releasing these compilation sets for most of the trading card game series they sold. This set, containing 130 cards, replaced the previous Base Set, and all energy cards printed between Base Set 2's release and the Gym Heroes set were printed as base set 2 cards. It is identified by the symbol of a Pokéball with the number 2 running through it.

Team Rocket 

Team Rocket, released in April 2000, is the 5th set of cards in the Pokémon Trading Card Game. The title refers to a criminal organization from the video game Pokémon Red, Blue, and Yellow, and also features the trio of Rockets known as Jessie, James, and Meowth who relentlessly follow the protagonists in the anime. Its symbol is the R, which is the Team Rocket organization's symbol and can be seen on practically everything that comes from them.

This set introduced the Dark Pokémon, Pokémon corrupted and controlled by the Team Rocket organization. After the release of this set, Dark Pokémon would not show a strong presence until the set's sequel released four years later, Team Rocket Returns.

This is also the first set to include a card exclusive to the English-language version, though it was eventually released for the Japanese counterpart, as well. As part of a promotion, an American-only Dark Raichu can be found in this set, though it is the rarest card, as a "secret" card that is numbered above the regular set number: "83/82". The card was also available in Australian sets.

Gym Heroes 

Gym Heroes, released on August 14, 2000, is the 6th set of 132 cards in the Pokémon Trading Card Game. Its symbol is an amphitheater with a black stage and white tiers. Its name comes from the Gym Leaders it focuses around and how these first four Gym Leaders have relatively optimistic and carefree personalities compared to those featured in Gym Challenge. This set also introduced a card layout change, eliminating the flavor text and stacking the weakness/resistance/level to fit the Gym Leader's headshot/badge.

This is the first set to have Owner's Pokémon, the owners being the Gym Leaders of the various Pokémon Gyms around Kanto. While Sabrina and Blaine are also represented in this set, the most attention is paid to the first four met in the video games: Brock, Misty, Lt. Surge, and Erika. Each of their Pokémon reflects their favorite Pokémon types, as well as the Pokémon they have been seen carrying in the TV show. For example, Brock specializes in the Rock-type, so a lot of his cards in the card game are Rock Pokémon. However, in the anime, he also carried a Vulpix, a Fire-type, which is also included in this set.

The owner's Pokémon must be evolved from a Pokémon of the same owner, which also proved to be unpopular, as the element of mixing and matching cards from different sets is lost. Additionally, some of the "Rare" cards had little or no value in play, such as Misty's Tentacool, which is incapable of doing damage and is overshadowed by a better version of the "Uncommon" rarity. However, Owner's Pokémon have been sporadically released in Japan, though except for those within EX Team Magma vs Team Aqua, none have been translated into English. This set was originally released with theme decks that contained cards not found in the main set in Japan, released in the odd rarities for Basic Pokémon.

This set is also the first set to introduce Stadium cards, trainers that stay in play until another Stadium card comes into play.

Gym Challenge 

Gym Challenge, released on October 16, 2000, is the 7th set of cards in the Pokémon Trading Card Game. Its expansion symbol is an amphitheater and black tiers, the inverse of the Gym Heroes symbol. It also has a set of 132 cards. Its name comes from the four characters from the anime it focuses on (Sabrina, Koga, Blaine, and Giovanni).

Second Generation Sets

Neo Genesis 
Neo Genesis, released in December 2000, is the 8th set of 111 cards in the Pokémon Trading Card Game. Its symbol is a pair of stars, one in front of the other. Neo is Greek for "new", and Genesis is 1w22won Pokémon that come from the region of Johto and is the first set to do so. With it comes two new Pokémon types: Darkness and Metal, each with its own Energy cards.

The design on the cards has also changed, now looking closer to the Japanese version. The hit points displayed on the upper-right are now smaller, and their color has changed from red to black. The statistics on the bottom of the card now have dune-shaped indentations in the background immediately behind each stat. The text reading "Basic Pokémon" is now directly under the HP (Hit Points) instead of in the upper-left corner. The information about the Pokémon directly below the illustration is now in a parallelogram instead of a rectangle.

Two cards from this set were banned from tournament play: Sneasel and Slowking. Controversial Japanese illustrations of the cards Moo-Moo Milk, Arcade Game, and Card-Flip Game were significantly changed in the English release.

It was at this point the 2 different play formats were realized: Unlimited (allowing all cards to be played), and Limited where only the Neo Genesis cards could be played (this limited format would go through a few changes whereas more sets were released where the rules were changed to "Neo Genesis and newer cards are allowed to be played in official tournaments" this would later be changed to be "only the 8 most recent sets are legal for tournament play"). At this point, the idea of "proxy" cards became frequent at tournaments where an older card could be used as a placeholder for a card a player only had a single print of.

Neo Discovery 
Neo Discovery, released in June 2001, is the ninth set of 75 cards in the Pokémon Trading Card Game. Its symbol is a Mayan temple. While the architectural structure of the ruins is ambiguous in the video games Pokémon Gold, Silver, and Crystal, in Pokémon 3: The Movie, they seem to be of Central or South American origin. Neo Discovery premieres many second-generation Pokémon into the card game, such as Smeargle, Politoed, and Wobbuffet and may be considered a counterpart to the Jungle set (which introduced another third of the original 150 Pokémon).

The Unown arePokémon-themedd on the English alphabet. At the time of Neo Discovery's release, there were 26 types, one for each letter. (Later, Unown ? and Unown ! would be introduced, bringing the total to 28.) Neo Discovery introduced nine of these Pokémon into the card game. Each could affect the game in different ways related to a word starting with the letter the Unown represents. Unown "O" is associated with the word observe, and this application in the card game is done through "observing" the opponent's deck.

Southern Islands 
Southern Islands is a set of cards in the Pokémon Trading Card Game. In Japan, it was released at the same time as Gym 2, while in America it came after Neo Discovery and before Neo Revelation. This set's symbol is a palm tree.

Though it is often considered the 10th set, it was a promotional set, sold as a complete collection in the form of a specially-packaged box (rather than as booster packs). The mini-set only contains a total of 18 cards. When arranged correctly, every illustration used in this set forms a single larger image.

Neo Revelation 
Neo Revelation, released in October 2001, is the 11th set of 64 cards in the Pokémon Trading Card Game. Its symbol is a representation of the departure of Suicune, Entei, and Raikou from the Burned Tower.

As of the release of this set, there was at least one card of each of the 251 Pokémon, including the elusive Celebi. This set finishes the second generation with Pokémon like Porygon2, Misdreavus, and Raikou. In a way, this makes it a counterpart to the Fossil set (which rounded out the original set of 151 Pokémon). It also includes three more of the Unown introduced in Neo Discovery.

Most importantly, this set was the debut of the Shiny Pokémon. Shining Pokémon are extremely powerful, but no more than one of each kind is allowed in a deck. This tradition was short-lived, however, as the Shining Pokémon were present only until the following set, Neo Destiny. However, Pokémon Star cards, which function almost identically to Shining Pokémon, were introduced in a later set known as EX Team Rocket Returns.

Neo Destiny 
Neo Destiny, released in February 2002, is the 12th set of 105 cards in the Pokémon Trading Card Game. Its symbol is a blue sparkle above a white sparkle, possibly referring to the Dark and Light Pokémon within this set. This set almost completes the Unown alphabet started in Neo Discovery (R was left out, but was eventually given a card in another set years later. J was also left out, being a Promo).

This set is the second set with an emphasis on Dark Pokémon, though unlike its predecessor, Team Rocket, these Dark Pokémon don't seem to have any influences. In this set and only this set, they are counterbalanced by Light Pokémon. Whereas Dark Pokémon have low hit points (health) and do a lot of damage, Light Pokémon have high Hit Points and have attacks and other abilities that revolve around support, such as healing damage.

Legendary Collection 
The Legendary Collection, released in May 2002, is the 13th set of 110 cards in the Pokémon Trading Card Game. The set's symbol is a medal.

The Legendary Collection is the sequel to Base Set 2, made up entirely of reprints from the first four sets: Base Set, Jungle, Fossil, and Team Rocket. Its purpose is to make these cards legal in tournament play; otherwise, these cards would be considered "too old." Thus, some people could claim this set to be a third "Base Set". The Legendary Collection is the first set to have a parallel set whose only difference is that shiny foil is printed on the entire front of the card except for its illustration (this isn't done in the regular set). Strangely, even though this set is an amalgamation of four sets, this set contains fewer cards than any of the following three.

Expedition Base Set 
Expedition Base Set, released in September 2002, is the 14th set of cards in the Pokémon Trading Card Game. Its symbol is a Poké Ball drawn to look like a lower-case "e". At 165 cards (330 if its parallel set is included).

It is the first to use the e-Reader: By scanning a dot code found on the bottom of all of the cards and the sides of some, the e-Reader can display patterns, produce sounds, or other various novelties. However, none of these features are required for play. Subsequent sets, up until EX Hidden Legends, would also be compatible with the e-Reader.

Because of its completely new format, this was thought to be a good time to balance the card game with less powerful versions of previously printed cards. For example, Energy Removal 2 serves an identical purpose to Energy Removal from the Base Set, except a coin must be flipped to determine if the effects are successful. However, this set also introduces the Supporter card, a type of Trainer card that now dominates the competitive play.

Aquapolis 
Aquapolis, released in January 2003, is the 15th set of cards in the Pokémon Trading Card Game and consists of 186 cards. Its symbol is a skyline within a water droplet.

This set is the second of three to extensively use the e-Reader. Aquapolis introduces minigames playable by scanning in dot codes from multiple cards (in any order). These mini-games are usually very simple, and more often than not, each Pokémon whose card has been scanned in will play some role in the mini-game.

While Technical Machines were dabbled upon in Expedition, Aquapolis is the set to make use of them. Technical Machines would be released sparingly from this point onward.

The Aquapolis set was also the first Pokémon TCG set to utilize the "Crystal Type" Poké-power. This power was written on the Aquapolis cards Kingdra, Lugia, and Nidoking, all of which are holofoil. It essentially allows the player to attach a basic energy card to the Pokémon and have it become that type for the turn. Note that this power does not allow the player to attach an additional energy card per turn.

Of the 186 cards, the first 32 were designated with an "H" before the number. The 33rd card started at the number "1." Thus, the number sequence only goes up to 147 (the 3 "Crystal Types" take the number to 150/147). In addition, 4 cards received 2 versions: Golduck (50a, 50b), Drowzee (74a, 74b), Mr. Mime (95a, 95b), and Porygon (103a, 103b). These cards are identical except for the data they show when swiped through the e-Reader.

Skyridge 
Skyridge, released on May 12, 2003, August 15, 2003, in both English and German respectively, is the 16th set of cards in the Pokémon Trading Card Game. Its symbol is a pair of mountains with a halo around the taller one. This is the last set published by Wizards of the Coast and has 182 cards.

This set is the last of three to extensively use the e-Reader. Skyridge continues Aquapolis' tradition of minigames playable by scanning in dot codes from multiple cards.

The Skyridge set was also the second and last set to contain Pokémon with the "Crystal Type" Poké-power. Characters in this set were Celebi, Charizard, Crobat, Golem, Ho-oh, and Kabutops. These cards normally carry a much higher trade value on eBay and other online retailers than normal cards from this set. However, even normal cards from Skyridge are more valuable than normal cards from other sets, because Skyridge booster packs were very hard to find compared to other sets.

The numbering system for Skyridge is similar to that of Aquapolis. The first 32 cards begin with an "H" and the 33rd card starts the numbering at "1", and thus the number only goes up to 144. The 6 "Crystal Types" take it to 150/144. There are no "a" and "b" versions in Skyridge as there were in Aquapolis.

Skyridge was the last set released by Wizards of the Coast.

The Pokémon Company
In July 2003, The Pokémon Company took the place of Wizards of the Coast as publisher for the cards. The first set published by Pokémon USA, Inc. was EX Ruby and Sapphire.

Third Generation Sets
All of the Third Generation sets have "EX" in their name; this comes from the Pokémon EX present in these sets.

EX Ruby and Sapphire
EX Ruby and Sapphire, released on June 18, 2003, is the 17th set of 109 cards in the Pokémon Trading Card Game. This set was the first set to be adapted into English by Pokémon USA, Inc. after the card game's rights transferred back from Wizards of the Coast. Its symbol is a jewel with a brilliant cut, viewed from above. It is named after the video games Pokémon Ruby and Sapphire.

This set introduces third-generation Pokémon and continues to be scannable by the e-Reader. However, the dot codes on the left side of the card are gone, replaced with a single dot code on the bottom. Unlike the cards in Expedition, Aquapolis, and Skyridge, however, this dot code produces only where to find the Pokémon in the video games instead of completely original Pokédex information. This set yet again changes the layout of the cards; except for the dot code at the bottom (which is now absent), it is exactly the same as the Japanese layout and is the format used up to this day.

This set is also the first to have Pokémon-ex, Pokémon who are stronger than usual, but the rewards are doubled if a player can take one down. During its release, these Pokémon were exceedingly useful, but as more cards were released, the card game became increasingly stacked against Pokémon-ex.

EX Sandstorm

EX Sandstorm, released on September 18, 2003, is the 18th set of cards in the Pokémon Trading Card Game and the 2nd set released by Pokémon USA Inc. Its symbol is a pair of fossils: the Claw Fossil and the Root Fossil from the video games Pokémon Ruby and Sapphire. It has a set of 100 cards. The Sandstorm name comes from the fact that the player must retrieve these fossils in the video game from within a sandstorm.

EX Sandstorm also continues to introduce third-generation Pokémon into the card game, with many desert-themed Pokémon, such as Cacnea and Vibrava, and thereof unrelated Pokémon, such as Zangoose and Sableye. This set brings back the Mysterious Fossil from the Fossil set and expands on it with the Claw Fossil, which can be made into Anorith, and the Root Fossil, which can be made into Lileep. The Mysterious Fossil plays the same role as before, which is to evolve it into Omanyte, Kabuto, or Aerodactyl. Other Pokémon from older generations return, such as Xatu from the second generation and Psyduck from the first.

EX Dragon
EX Dragon, released in November 2003, is the 19th set of cards in the Pokémon Trading Card Game and the 3rd set released by Pokémon USA. The set's symbol is a crosshair. This set numbers up to 97 cards, but there are 100 with the 3 secret cards, and its main emphasis is Dragon Pokémon. These usually appear as Colorless-type Pokémon, but they tend to use two or more different types of Energy (an example is Salamence, which uses Fire and Water Energy). Many of the Pokémon in EX Dragon made their debut in the set. Salamence, Flygon and Altaria are three of the Dragon Pokémon in the set – others, such as Latios, Latias, Dragonite and Rayquaza appear as Pokémon-EX. EX Dragon is the first set in the third generation of the Pokémon Trading Card Game to be based on Dragon Pokémon; the other set, EX Dragon Frontiers, is the penultimate set of the same generation.

EX Team Magma vs Team Aqua 
EX Team Magma vs Team Aqua, released in March 2004, is the 20th set of cards in the Pokémon Trading Card Game and the 4th set released by Pokémon USA. The set's symbol is a maroon "X" that's slightly slanted, somewhat like a cut or a scar. This set contains 95 cards and was the last set to feature e-Reader compatibility.

EX Hidden Legends
EX Hidden Legends, released in June 2004, is the 21st set of cards in the Pokémon Trading Card Game and the 5th set released by Pokémon USA. Its symbol is a trapezoid with six equally-spaced smaller dots surrounding it. This entire setup is within a solid white irregular hexagon. The Hidden Legends part refers to Regirock, Regice, and Registeel, Legendary Pokémon hidden away in stone structures. This set contains 101 different cards

This set revolves around three concepts: Regirock, Regice, and Registeel, as mentioned above; Jirachi, a Legendary Pokémon with the power of wishes; and Pokémon 4Ever with the presence of Dark Celebi. This set also continues to introduce Pokémon into the card game. In addition to the Pokémon above, Beldum and its evolution line make its debut.

EX Fire Red and Leaf Green
EX Fire Red and Leaf Green, released in September 2004, is the 22nd set of cards in the Pokémon Trading Card Game and the 6th set released by Pokémon USA. Its symbol is an emblem of a black Pokéball. It came out around the time the Nintendo video games, Pokémon Fire Red and Leaf Green were released. The set had some extra cards: 113/112 Charmander, Box Topper; 114/112 Articuno ex, Secret ex; 115/112 Moltres ex, Secret ex; and 116/112 Zapdos ex, Secret ex.

EX Team Rocket Returns
EX Team Rocket Returns, released in November 2004, is the 23rd set of cards in the Pokémon Trading Card Game and the 7th set released by Pokémon USA. Its symbol is an emblem of Team Rocket, a shield-like shape with a black bold R in the center. It has a set of 109. This emblem for Team Rocket is unusual as it appears nowhere else; the purpose of this emblem is probably to distinguish this set from the former Team Rocket set. This set also introduced Dark Pokémon

Team Rocket as a criminal organization – its members, the Pokémon it controls, and the techniques it uses for world domination are all part of this set's theme. The Returns part is an indication that it's a sequel set to the Team Rocket set released four years earlier. This set introduced star Pokémon, which are shiny just like those of the Neo Revelations set. Only one of these Pokémon with the star symbol on the card next to the name may be present in a deck.

EX Deoxys
EX Deoxys, released in February 2005, is the 24th set of cards in the Pokémon Trading Card Game and the 8th set released by Pokémon USA. The set's symbol is a shooting star and has 107 cards. The set is named after the Pokémon Deoxys and also features Rayquaza, both of which were the featured legendary Pokémon in the seventh Pokémon movie, Pokémon: Destiny Deoxys. While the Pokémon in this set have little, if anything, to do with either of these two Pokémon, the set's Trainer cards feature people and places involved with astronomy in the Pokémon Ruby, Sapphire, and Emerald video games. Of the franchise

EX Emerald
EX Emerald, released in May 2005, is the 25th set of cards in the Pokémon Trading Card Game and the 9th set released by Pokémon USA. Its symbol is a gemstone, presumably an emerald. It has a set of 106 cards. Nintendo released six 15-card packs, known as Quick Construction Packs – one pack for each type of Basic Energy.

The set is also composed of Japanese promos that were never brought outside Japan. Because of this, and the fact that most promos are viewed as "unplayable" in the competitive scene, this set was largely ignored, with exceptions to Medicham ex.

EX Unseen Forces
EX Unseen Forces, released in August 2005, is the 26th set of cards in the Pokémon Trading Card Game and the 10th set released by Pokémon USA. The set's symbol is a black silhouette of Ho-Oh's wing, superimposed on a white silhouette of Lugia's wing. it is a set of 115 cards, plus 2 secret cards (including the box topper), plus 28 Unowns. The set, which in Japan was named "GoldenSky and SilverSea", is set in Johto, and is the first set by Pokémon USA to mainly consist of Pokémon from the Pokémon Gold and Silver games, released in 2001. EX Unseen Forces is known for having more Pokémon-ex than any other set to date, with a total of fourteen (including one box topper and one secret rare card).

EX Delta Species

EX Delta Species, released in October 2005, is the 27th set of cards in the Pokémon Trading Card Game and the 11th set released by Pokémon USA. It contains 113 different cards. While this set was released after EX Legends hit in Japan, it was released before Legend Maker in English-language territories. The set, which in Japan was named "Researching Tower of Holon", is set in the research centre, Holon. Its logo/symbol is Holon Tower, a tower with a broad top floor.

This set introduces rare "Delta Species" Pokémon, which are unusually unique types. For example, Tyranitar would typically be a Dark- or Fighting-type Pokémon, but in this set Tyranitar is a Metal/Fire dual-typed Pokémon. Dragonite would typically be a Colorless- Pokémon, but in this set Dragonite is a Metal/Lightning dual-typed Pokémon. It also introduces the staff of Holon Tower and their Pokémon. The Holon staff appears in the form of Supporter cards, all of which require a card to be discarded in order for them to be used, and Holon's Pokémon, which can be used as either Pokémon or as Energy cards.

EX Legend Maker
EX Legend Maker, released in February 2006, is the 28th set of 92 cards in the Pokémon Trading Card Game and the 12th set released by Pokémon USA. The set, which in Japan was named "Eidolon Forest", is set in a forest in the middle of nowhere. Its symbol is a stylized forest, a white egg-shaped area with three black acute isosceles triangles. It received the name Legend Maker due to the inclusion of Mew.

Due to a mix-up with translations, this was supposed to be released before EX Delta Species, but was delayed until February 2006 in English-language territories. This is considered by many to be a very good set, for several reasons – possibly for its similarity with Jungle and Fossil original expansions, or possibly for its exclusion of the complicated Delta Species Pokémon.

EX Holon Phantoms
EX Holon Phantoms, released in May 2006, is the 29th set of cards in the Pokémon Trading Card Game and the 13th set released by Pokémon USA. Its symbol is the Holon symbol, with three triangles around the sides. The set, which in Japan was named "Holon Phantom", is set in an undeveloped area of Holon. It marks the return of Delta Species Pokémon, after they debuted in EX Delta Species. This set contains 110 Cards in total. This set included cards such as Sharpedo, Nosepass, Torchic, and others that are selectively stamped with the EX Holon Phantoms logo. The back of the cards from this set also have a lighter back than other sets.

EX Crystal Guardians
EX Crystal Guardians, released in July 2006, is the 30th set of cards in the Pokémon Trading Card Game and the 14th set released by Pokémon USA. Its symbol is a sliver of a crystal. 100 cards are included in this set release.

EX Dragon Frontiers
EX Dragon Frontiers, released in November 2006, is the 31st set of cards in the Pokémon Trading Card Game and the 15th set released by Pokémon USA. Its symbol is a pair of black mountains on a circular white background. It is a set of 101 cards. The set is based on an unknown set of islands far away, inhabited primarily by Dragon Pokémon. This set marks the final appearance of Delta Species Pokémon, and, strangely, almost every single Pokémon card is Delta Species. There are even "Delta Star" Pokémon, Mew, and Charizard, whose type depends on their alternate color (Shiny form), which is, in this case, Water and Dark, respectively.

This set introduces a new mechanic: Shockwave and Imprison markers. These markers are similar to special conditions, save that they can be applied to benched Pokémon and that they don't go away when the Pokémon retreats. Only three cards in the set use these markers, however: two Pokémon place the markers, and one Pokémon can remove them.

EX Power Keepers
EX Power Keepers, released in February 2007, is the 32nd set of cards in the Pokémon Trading Card Game. The symbol for this set is a road leading to a vanishing horizon on which the sun is either rising or setting. It is a set of 108 cards.

It is the first set since EX Emerald to be released only outside Japan, and the first since EX Unseen Forces not to include Delta Species Pokémon. The set is loosely based on the Hoenn Elite Four, as all four members (Drake, Glacia, Phoebe, and Sidney) have their own Stadium cards, and the Pokémon-EX is all Pokémon owned by members of the Elite Four. The set also consists of several reprints of cards from older sets and is the last third-generation set.

Fourth Generation Sets
All of the Fourth Generation sets have the words "Diamond and Pearl", "Platinum", "HeartGold SoulSilver", or "Legends" in their names; this comes from the Pokémon Diamond, Pokémon Pearl, Pokémon Platinum, Pokémon HeartGold and Pokémon SoulSilver video games present in these sets.

Diamond and Pearl Base Set
Diamond and Pearl Base Set, released in May 2007, is the 33rd set of cards in the Pokémon Trading Card Game and the 17th set released by Pokémon USA. Its symbol is a circle in an upside-down pentagon. it is a set of 130 cards. The set is the first in English-language territories to include fourth-generation Pokémon; namely, those that first featured in the Pokémon Diamond and Pearl video games on the Nintendo DS. Several new rules were introduced to the Pokémon Trading Card Game with the release of Diamond & Pearl Base Set in Japan, and several changes have been made to the format of the cards; some of these changes were included in previous card formats, and others are brand new. One such change is the introduction of Pokémon LV.X, replacing the retired Pokémon-ex and Pokémon-"star" cards. This is also the first set in which Pokémon classified as Poison type in the video game series would be identified as Psychic rather than Grass type and the first set to include Pokémon cards with "energy-less attacks" denoted by a transparent effect where energy requirements would normally be. Basic Dark and Steel Energy cards are introduced in this set. Three holographic Pokémon cards from this set were released in tin sets a few weeks prior to the set's launch. These tins included a Tyranitar tin featuring a Turtwig, a Camerupt tin featuring a Chimchar, and a Milotic tin featuring a Piplup.

Diamond and Pearl – Mysterious Treasures
Diamond and Pearl – Mysterious Treasures, released in August 2007, is the 34th set of cards in the Pokémon Trading Card Game and the 18th set released by Pokémon USA. Its symbol is a shiny jewel. The set introduces the Sinnoh Legendary trio, Uxie, Mesprit, and Azelf, as well as the fourth-generation Fossil Pokémon Rampardos and Bastiodon, both featured in their respective theme decks. The set also introduces "Pokémon with Item" cards, Pokémon cards with held items that work similarly to the Poké-Body mechanic. For this particular set, all held items are the berries found in the Pokémon Diamond and Pearl games. The set includes three new Pokémon LV.X and has a total of 124 cards. It is also the first set to include a secret card since EX Holon Phantoms.

Diamond and Pearl – Secret Wonders
Diamond and Pearl – Secret Wonders released in November 2007, is the 35th set of cards in the Pokémon Trading Card Game and the 19th set released by Pokémon USA. Its symbol is a whirlpool. The set includes several more "Pokémon with Item" cards: Pokémon cards with integrated Pokémon Tools, which include specific items from the Pokémon Diamond and Pearl games, such as the Moon Stone and Reaper Cloth evolution items. The set also includes two new Pokémon LV.X. and has 132 cards.

Set of 123 was created in 2007

Diamond and Pearl – Great Encounters

Diamond and Pearl – Great Encounters is the 36th set of cards in the Pokémon Trading Card Game and the 20th set released by Pokémon USA, released in February 2008, and is the second-smallest Diamond and Pearl set to date, with 106 cards. Its symbol is a triskelion inside a hexagon. The set introduces Darkrai, an event Pokémon and legendary Pokémon featured alongside Dialga and Palkia in Pokémon: The Rise of Darkrai. The set also features four more Pokémon LV.X.

Diamond and Pearl – Majestic Dawn
Diamond and Pearl – Majestic Dawn, released in May 2008 is the 37th set of cards in the Pokémon Trading Card Game and the 21st set released by Pokémon USA. Its symbol is a rising sun coming over a hill, hence the name Majestic Dawn. It is the smallest Diamond and Pearl set to date with 100 cards. This set introduces Leafeon and Glaceon as two new evolutions of Eevee and includes four more Pokémon LV.X.

Diamond and Pearl – Legends Awakened
Diamond and Pearl – Legends Awakened is the 38th set of cards of the Trading Card Game and the 22nd released by Pokémon USA, and was released in August 2008. The set reintroduces Technical Machines to the Trading Card Game and includes the last of the Pokémon card variants of Pokémon first seen in  Pokémon Diamond and Pearl Video Games (excluding unreleased Shaymin and Arceus). The set includes seven Pokémon LV.X, more than any set thus far. Many great decks came out of LA LV.X cards, a prominent one being AMU. It is the fourth-largest set in the history of the TCG with 146 cards.

Diamond and Pearl – Stormfront
Diamond and Pearl – Stormfront is the 39th set of cards of the Trading Card Game and the 23rd released by Pokémon USA, and was released in November 2008. Its symbol is a circle with a lightning bolt running through it. It is a set of 100 cards. The set reintroduced Pokémon of alternate coloration (better known as shiny Pokémon) and was the first set of the Diamond and Pearl series to reprint three "classic" cards from the first Trading Card Game expansions. The set includes eight Pokémon LV.X, two of which were also released as promotional cards. It also introduced trainer cards that can be used with another one at the same time.

Platinum Base Set
Platinum Base Set is the 40th set of cards of the Trading Card Game and the 24th released by Pokémon USA. It was released on October 13, 2008, in Japan and in the United States on February 11, 2009. It introduces the never-before-seen Pokémon Shaymin and includes a new Trainer-specific variant of Pokémon known as Pokémon SP. The set also includes a new mechanic called the Lost Zone, which acts as a second discard pile but one from which players cannot retrieve cards. It features two theme decks, one built around Shaymin, "Flourish", and the other around Renegade Pokémon Giratina, "Rebellion". Platinum includes six Pokémon LV.X, two of which are Shaymin (one of Land Forme and one of Sky Forme), and 127 cards in total. The set includes 6 secret cards. Two of the Pokémon LV.X were released as promotional reprints with new artwork on March 2, 2009. The new Pokémon SP has Team Galactic Pokémon like Dialga.

Platinum – Rising Rivals
Platinum – Rising Rivals is the 41st set of cards of the Trading Card Game and the 25th released by Pokémon USA. It is a set of 114 cards not including the 6 secret holofoil cards of the Pokémon Rotom. It expands on the recent creation of Pokémon SP (trainer-owned Pokémon) with Gym Leader's Pokémon and Elite Four's Pokémon. It was released on December 26, 2008, in Japan. It was released in the US on May 16, 2009. the cards from this set include Luxray GL LV.X, Lucian's Assignment, Gallade 4 LV.X, and a new version of Infernape LV.X. It was not reprinted, this Infernape is now in SP form, with different attacks and a Poke-Power. Some other LV.X include Alakazam LV.X and Snorlax LV.X. It also includes some hidden rares which are remakes of original cards from the first sets. They have as much value as a LV.X. They include the original Pikachu, Surfing Pikachu, and Flying Pikachu. The main Pokémon from this set is Rotom, which has many unique forms: Wash, Mow, Fan, Heat, and Frost Rotom.

Platinum – Supreme Victors
Platinum – Supreme Victors is the 42nd set of cards of the Trading Card Game and the 26th released by Pokémon USA. It was released on March 6, 2009, in Japan and was released in the United States on August 19, 2009. It is a set of 147 cards. Its symbol is two connected upside-down triangles. This set contains Frontier Brain Pokémon as well as the Champion's Pokémon. New LV.X Pokémon, like, Rayquaza C LV. X and Charizard G LV. X are also included.

Platinum – Arceus
Platinum – Arceus is the 43rd set of cards of the Trading Card Game and the 27th released by Pokémon USA. Contains 99 different cards. It was released on July 5, 2008, in Japan and was released in North America on November 4, 2009.

This set marks the TCG debut of the final Generation IV Pokémon, Arceus. All the Arceus Pokémon cards have a special rule printed on them that allows you to have any number of Pokémon with the name "Arceus" in your deck, as opposed to the normal 4-per-deck rule.

Six additional new Lv. Xs were included in this expansion, three of which were different forms of Arceus Lv. X, the other three being Gengar Lv. X, Salamence Lv. X and Tangrowth Lv. X. This expansion also marked the continuation of the "Shining" Pokémon which were featured through the Platinum booster series. Each of these cards had a different collector number sequence than the other cards in the expansion, which were Bagon (SH10) Ponyta (SH11), and Shinx (SH12).

HeartGold SoulSilver Base Set
HeartGold SoulSilver Base Set is based on the Pokémon video games of the same title. This set has over 123 cards in it. It includes the new Pokémon Prime cards, which replace Lv.Xs. This set also features 2 Legend Pokémon which are one Pokémon made up of 2 cards. They are Ho-oh and Lugia. It has an Alph Lithograph in it. This set has 3 theme decks.

HeartGold and SoulSilver – Unleashed
HeartGold and SoulSilver – Unleashed is the second Pokémon trading card game set based on the Pokémon games,  Pokémon HeartGold and SoulSilver. The set has a total of 95 cards, including Tyranitar (Prime), Steelix (Prime), Crobat (Prime), Kingdra (Prime), Lanturn (Prime), Ursaring (Prime), Entei and Raikou LEGEND, Raikou and Suicune LEGEND, and Suicune and Entei LEGEND. The set also features a Secret Rare card" Alph Lithograph. Unlike the one in the previous set, HGSS, this one allows the player to shuffle their deck. There are 4 versions of Alph Lithograph. HeartGold and SoulSilver – Unleashed is the first set to feature dual-Legend cards, which consist of two Pokémon on the same two-card Legend. However, these Pokémon, when Knocked Out, allow the opponent to draw 2 Prize Cards rather than 1. The set features Chaos Control (Tyranitar) and Steel Sentinel (Steelix) decks.

HeartGold and SoulSilver – Undaunted
HeartGold and SoulSilver – Undaunted is the third Pokémon trading card game set based on the Pokémon games, Pokémon HeartGold and SoulSilver. The set has a total of 90 cards, including Raichu (Prime), Houndoom (Prime), Espeon (Prime), Umbreon (Prime), Scizor (Prime), Slowking (Prime), Rayquaza and Deoxys LEGEND and Kyogre and Groudon LEGEND. The set also features a Secret Rare card: Alph Lithograph. This one allows the player to return any stadium in play to its owner's hand. Heartgold and Soulsilver Undaunted continue the trend of dual-Legend cards, Legend cards depicting 2 Pokémon that allow the opponent to draw 2 prize cards when Knocked Out. The starter decks for HGSS Undaunted are Nightfall, a dark/metal type deck featuring Umbreon, and Daybreak, a grass/psychic type deck featuring Espeon. With HGSS Undaunted came out there were two changes to the Starter Deck packaging: they now contain an additional booster pack from the set as well as a cardboard deck box that can hold a 60-card unsleeved deck.

HeartGold and SoulSilver – Triumphant
HeartGold and SoulSilver – Triumphant is the Fourth Pokémon trading card game set based on the Pokémon games, Pokémon HeartGold and SoulSilver. The set has a total of 102 cards, including Absol (Prime), Celebi (Prime), Gengar (Prime), Electrode (Prime), Mew (Prime), Magnezone (Prime), Yanmega (Prime), Machamp (Prime), Darkrai/Cresselia LEGEND and Dialga/Palkia LEGEND. The set also features a Secret Rare card: Alph Lithograph. This one, unlike the ones in the previous sets, allows the player to look at all of their face-down prize cards. Heartgold and Soulsilver Triumphant continue the trend of dual-Legend cards, Legends depicting 2 Pokémon that allow the opponent to draw 2 prize cards when Knocked Out. The starter decks for HGSS Triumphant are Royal Guard, a Psychic/Fighting type deck featuring Nidoking, and Verdant Frost, a grass/water type deck featuring Mamoswine. It is speculated to be the last Heartgold and Soulsilver set in America. The set contains cards from the Japanese set "Clash at the Summit" and the mini-set Lost Link. One card missing from the set is the Stadium "Lost World" which introduced a new win condition to the game in Japan. The card, along with the other cards missing from the Lost Link set was released in the next expansion, Call of Legends.

Call of Legends
Call of Legends is a stand-alone English set of reprints and previously unreleased cards. Contains 95 different cards. Due to the extended time period between HeartGold and SoulSilver – Triumphant and the release of the 5th generation of Pokémon video games this set was released as a filler set. It contains reprints from the HeartGold and SoulSilver sets, as well as the remaining cards from the Japanese Lost Link set. In addition, it contains cards of legendary Pokémon in shiny and non-shiny forms. The shiny Pokémon are also known as Shiny Legendaries, and for example, Shiny Suicune is number SL11. There are a total of 11 shiny Legendaries.

Japanese Pokémon Heartgold and Soulsilver sets
When the Heartgold and Soulsilver Pokémon trading card lineup was released in Japan, it was done differently from in the United States. It also had an abnormally long waiting period between the first and second sets.

Heartgold and Soulsilver Collection
Heartgold and Soulsilver Collection is the first Japanese set based on the Heartgold and Soulsilver games. It has 140 cards in total, including the following special cards: Alph Lithograph, Ursaring Prime, Crobat Prime, Typhlosion Prime, Meganium Prime, Blissey Prime, Donphan Prime, Ampharos Prime, Feraligatr Prime, Lugia LEGEND, and Ho-Oh LEGEND. Starting from this set, the Trainer cards in Japan have been renamed Goods cards. It has been renamed in America as HeartGold SoulSilver, or HS.

Heartgold and Soulsilver special decks
The Heartgold and Soulsilver special decks were released in between the releases of the first and second Heartgold and Soulsilver sets. Expert Deck: Leafeon vs. Metagross is a set of two 60-card decks (120 different cards) with a CD for online play. In addition to being more powerful than most theme decks, the Leafeon and Metagross decks have special cards that weren't released in any other Japanese sets. There are also Battle Starter decks, which were released with special cards only available to their specific deck. The decks are named Offense (fire types), Defense (grass types), Speed (electric types), and Skill (water types).

Heartgold and Soulsilver Revived Legends
Heartgold and Soulsilver Revived Legends is the second Japanese set based on the Heartgold and Soulsilver games. It has 80 cards, including the following special cards: Tyranitar Prime, Steelix Prime, Lanturn Prime, Kingdra Prime, Entei & Raikou LEGEND, Suicune & Entei LEGEND, Raikou & Suicune LEGEND, and Alph Lithograph. It has been renamed HS Unleashed in the United States.

Lost Link Mini-Series
Lost Link is a mini-set that features Mew Prime, Absol Prime, Gengar Prime, Darkrai and Cresselia LEGEND, and Magnezone Prime. The set has a total of 40 cards. In Japan, it was released on April 16. Though the boosters have 8 cards rather than 11 in Japan, they cost less than regular boosters. The special feature of the series is that it includes a Stadium called Lost World, which has a revolutionary effect. However, the mini-set will not be released in the United States, but instead will be combined with the cards from the Japanese set Clash at the Summit, to make HS Triumphant, which was released in the United States in early November.

Fifth Generation Sets
All of the Fifth Generation sets have the words "Black and White" in their names; this comes from the Pokémon Black and Pokémon White video games present in these sets. The first set was released on April 6, 2011, and included codes that allowed purchasers to play online with an identical deck.

Sixth Generation Sets
The sixth generation sets have "XY" in their names. This comes from the sixth generation video games Pokémon X and Pokémon Y.

Generations
Generations is an extra set in the X and Y series of Pokémon cards. This set features many reprints from recent and older sets, including the First and Second Generations. Slowpoke is a reprint from Fossil and the Tauros card uses the artwork from Jungle. Pokémon-EX and Pokémon BREAK are also printed with similar style to the First Generation Sets.

Seventh Generation Sets
The seventh generation sets have Sun & Moon in their name. This comes from the seventh generation of video games  Pokémon Sun and Moon.

Sun & Moon – Shining Legends is an extra set in the Sun & Moon series of Pokémon cards. It was released on October 6, 2017, however, Pokémon Center Online had already released them if players pre-ordered from the website. This set brings back the Shining mechanics from the Second Generation sets (Neo series), with the Legendary Pokémon.

Sun & Moon – Dragon Majesty is an expansion set released on September 7, 2018. The booster packs were sold as part of special collection boxes. The set features over 70 cards, including 6 Pokémon-GX cards, 2 Prism Star cards, and 6 full-art cards.

Sun & Moon – Detective Pikachu is a mini set released on March 29, 2019. The booster packs were sold as part of special collection boxes. The set features 18 cards with artwork and attacks based on the Pokémon: Detective Pikachu film. Many cards from the set were also distributed with a foil stamp if you bought a ticket to the movie.

Sun & Moon – Hidden Fates is a wild set released on August 23, 2019. For the first time, a Tag Team Pokémon GX trio card was released featuring the legendary birds of Articuno, Moltres, and Zapdos. Also, over 75 Pokémon are featured in their shiny forms including Charizard-GX and Mewtwo-GX. The set features over 150 cards, including 1 brand new Tag Team Pokémon-GX trio, 8 new Pokémon-GX cards, 15 trainer cards, and over 75 shiny Pokémon.

Eighth generation sets 
In conjunction with the launch of Pokémon Sword and Shield, a new generation of cards were released. The Japanese sets were released on December 6, 2019 within the "Premium Trainer Box Sword & Shield", and the English version was released on February 7, 2020.

Champion's Path is the first extra set in the Sword & Shield series of Pokémon cards. The first boxes for this set were released on September 25, 2020. Champion's Path contains over 70 cards with 15 Pokémon V cards, three Pokémon VMAX cards, and 19 trainer cards. Pokémon announced a special energy card earlier on, but this seems to not be the case.

Shining Fates is the second extra set in the Sword & Shield series of Pokémon cards.  This set was released on March 8, 2021.  Shining Fates contains over 190 cards including more than 30 Pokémon V and VMAX cards along with more than 100 shiny Pokémon. The set was extremely popular, and sold out for months on end, with the set's Elite Trainer Box selling for hundreds of dollars on eBay and other online stores. The set is best known for the shiny Charizard VMAX card included in the set's subset, the Shiny Vault, that caused the set to sell out in the first place. 

Celebrations wasreleased October 8, 2021, and is the set celebrating the 25th anniversary of the Pokémon franchise. It features 25 new cards, as well as 25 reprints of cards from past series. Each Celebrations pack only contains four cards, but all four cards in the pack are holographic rares or better.

Pokemon GO was released on July 1, 2022, and is the fourth extra set in the Sword and Shield series. Pokemon GO (TCG) contains 78 cards in the main set, with 10 secret rares as well, including 13 Pokemon V cards, 2 Pokemon VMAX cards, and 5 Pokemon VSTAR. Pokemon GO (TCG) is based on the incredibly popular mobile game of the same name. The set received lots of criticism from different news outlets for just being a lackluster cash grab with a Pokemon GO label slapped on top.

Ninth generation sets 
With the release of Pokemon games Scarlet and Violet, The Pokemon Company has announced the Scarlet and Violet series of the Pokemon TCG. The Japanese sets Scarlet ex and Violet ex will release on January 20, 2023, with the English set Scarlet and Violet releasing on March 31, 2023. The Scarlet and Violet series has some big changes coming, with the separation of Item and Tool cards, silver card borders, three holographic cards per pack, and a pack price raise from $3.99 to $4.49 USD.

Prerelease cards
Prerelease cards are reprints of one selected card from an expansion with a foil "PRERELEASE" stamped on the bottom right corner of the card illustration. There are currently 159 cards of this kind in the Pokémon Trading Card Game dating from the release of the Jungle expansion in 1999 to the release of the Silver Tempest expansion in 2022.

Wizards of the Coast first produced Prerelease cards when the Trading Card Game was first localized and were given to players of early test leagues. Prerelease cards were only awarded through select sites of the Pokémon League for the next three expansions before Wizards ended their production. 
After Pokémon USA acquired the rights to license and produce the Trading Card Game, Prerelease events were set up to coincide with the release of the upcoming expansions. In the United States, Prerelease events are held over two weekends prior to the commercial release of expansions.

Officially, there were only four Prerelease cards produced by Wizards of the Coast. These cards were Clefable (1/64) from the Jungle Expansion, Aerodactyl (1/62) from the Fossil Expansion, Dark Gyarados (8/82) from the Team Rocket Expansion, and Misty's Seadra (9/132) from the Gym Heroes Expansion. However, during the printing of the Clefable Prerelease cards, several Base Set Raichu cards were added to the printing sheet and were stamped with a foil "PRERELEASE". The error was eventually corrected and the Raichu cards were either destroyed or given to Wizards of the Coast employees. Wizards of the Coast had denied existence of the Prerelease Raichu for years until an employee released an image of the card in 2006.

Promotional cards

Throughout the Trading Card Game, there have been many promotional cards released. Promotional cards have a five-pointed black star with the word "PROMO" written across it in place of an "expansion" symbol.

The first promotional set consisted of 53 cards in all with a 54th being a holographic Ancient Mew (which is not recognized as a promo card due to its nonconforming layout). The 53 cards vary between holographic and normal and encompass Pokémon and Trainer cards alike. The most famous of these is likely the card "Birthday Pikachu", for its uniqueness and scarcity. The second promotional set, called Best of Game, was also released by Wizards of the Coast. It included reverse holographic reprints of Hitmonchan and Electabuzz from the Base Set, Rocket's Hitmonchan and Rocket's Mewtwo from Gym Challenge and Professor Elm from Neo Genesis. In addition, there were four new cards: Rocket's Sneasel and Rocket's Scizor from the Pokémon*VS Japanese expansion and Dark Ivysaur and Dark Venusaur from the Pokémon Web Japanese expansion. Many were taken directly from Japanese cards, though there were a few that simply had alternate art of regular expansion cards. Most were obtainable through league or tournament play, while others were mail-in offers, or exclusive to certain retailers.

There have also been "box toppers", special or secret cards that are included at the top of the booster packs in a booster box, as well as various "jumbo" cards, Skyridge for example, approximately four times the size of a regular card and not legal in play.

Under Nintendo's publishing house, the third promotional set consisted of 40 cards. The release of these cards coincided with the Pokémon Organized Play (POP) packs and as a result, are less well documented. They were obtainable in two-card booster packs, given for winning tournaments. The fourth promotional set is based on the Diamond & Pearl era card sets with 56 total cards. The fifth promotional set is based on the Heart Gold & Soul Silver era card sets with 25 total cards. The sixth promotional set is based on the Black & White era card sets with 101 total cards. The seventh promotional set is based on the X & Y era card sets with 211 total cards. The eighth promotional set is based on the Sun & Moon era card sets with 244 total cards. The ninth promotional set is based on the Sword & Shield era card sets and has over 185 total cards. The tenth promotional set is based on the Scarlet & Violet era card sets.

References

External links
 Pokémon Organized Play (POP) and Pokémon official website
 Pokémon TCG Sets catalog
 TCG page on Bulbapedia, the Pokémon encyclopedia
 Top 99 Rarest Pokémon Cards List

Pokémon Trading Card Game
Trading Card Game Sets